Jajarm (also Romanized as Jājarm) is a city and capital of Jajarm County, in North Khorasan Province, Iran.

Because of several historical and archeological sites, Jajarm is one of the most attractive cities in North Khorasan province. The city is placed on the border of Central Desert of Iran and has a unique vegetation. Jajarm has also known for its wildlife refuge which Iranian cheetah lives there. Jajarm has several bauxite mines and a plant is producing Alumina from bauxite.

Historical sites
The region of north-eastern Iran has not been explored archaeologically until recently. But now a lot of work is being done. Archaeological fieldwork in North Khorassan has already shown the richness of prehistoric cultures in the region.

Tepe Pahlavan
Tepe Pahlavan (Tappeh Pahlavan) is a prehistoric site near Jajarm city. It is a large Neolithic-Chalcolithic craft production site, located between the Alborz Mountains in the north, and the vast desert of Dasht-e Khavir in the south.

In 2014, an Iranian-German team carried out the first systematic excavations at Tappe Pahlavan.

The upper settlement horizon has been dated to the early sixth millennium BC. These are the earliest dates so far for the ceramic Neolithic period in Northeast Iran. The connections with the contemporary sites in Northeast Iran are evident, but also with the sites in Kopet Dag, 200 km to the east.

The ceramics are similar to the Cheshmeh Ali type. The Cheshmeh Ali cultural complex generally defines a Transitional Chalcolithic on the Iranian Central Plateau dating between 5500 and 4800 BC. Yet the radiocarbon dates at Pahlavan precede this period by 500 years. So Cheshmeh Ali type ceramics here may be a unique early local development.

The Jeitun ceramics, very common in Northeast Iran and southern Turkmenistan, are not found in Pahlavan. There is also very little evidence of agricultural activities here. Rather, this settlement seems to have been mostly occupied with bead production, processing the local semi-precious stone deposits.

Jorbat
Petroglyphic site of Jorbat (This area is locally known as Sang Neveshteh or the "inscribed stone") to the north of the plain of Jajarm is one of the largest rock-art complexes of Iran. Ranging from late Bronze Age to the ethnographic period, the rock art imagery of Jorbat has close parallels both in petroglyphic sites of the Central plateau of Iran and the Central Asian steppes.

References

Sources

 اطلس گیتاشناسی استان‌های ایران [Atlas Gitashenasi Ostanhai Iran] (Gitashenasi Province Atlas of Iran)

Prehistoric Iran
Cities in North Khorasan Province
National works of Iran